Ukrainian Americans are Americans who are of Ukrainian ancestry.  According to U.S. census estimates, in 2021 there were 1,017,586 Americans of Ukrainian descent representing 0.3% of the American population.  The Ukrainian population of the United States is thus the second largest outside the former Eastern Bloc; only Canada has a larger Ukrainian community under this definition.  According to the 2000 U.S. census, the metropolitan areas with the largest numbers of Ukrainian Americans are: New York City with 160,000; Philadelphia with 60,000; Chicago with 46,000; Detroit with 45,000; Los Angeles with 36,000; Cleveland with 26,000; Sacramento with 20,000; and  Indianapolis with 19,000. In 2018, the number of Ukrainian Americans surpassed 1 million.

History

The first Ukrainian immigrant to America, Ivan Bohdan, sailed with John Smith to the Jamestown colony in 1607.  Bohdan met Captain Smith during the Long Turkish War of 1593–1606 when the latter had fought the Turks, was captured, and escaped captivity by fleeing through Ukraine, Romania, Hungary, and other countries.  Large-scale Ukrainian immigration to America did not begin, however, until the 1880s.

From 1955 to 1965, St. Andrew Memorial Church in South Bound Brook, New Jersey, was constructed as a memorial honoring victims of the Holodomor of 1932–1933.

The largest wave of Ukrainians came in the early 1990s, after the 1991 fall of the Soviet Union.  A large number of those emigrating from Ukraine after the fall of the Soviet Union were Jewish or Protestant. Many Ukrainians of the newest immigration wave settled in large cities and regional centers, forming ethnic enclaves. In addition, many Ukrainian Americans arrived by way of Canada, which has a larger Ukrainian presence.

On September 11, 2001, 11 Ukrainian Americans perished at the World Trade Center in New York City during the acts of mass terrorism committed on that day. All of their names were listed and commemorated by Ukrinform, the National News Agency of Ukraine, during the nineteenth anniversary of the attacks in 2020.

Ukrainian Americans living in Northern New Jersey and the remainder of the Northeastern United States have long been politically vocal about Ukrainian affairs, often traveling to Washington, D.C., to express their concerns.

In Bloomingdale (near Chicago) on September 21, 2015, Filaret, the Ukrainian Orthodox Patriarch of Kyiv and All Rus'-Ukraine, consecrated the first North American monument to the Revolution of Dignity's "Heavenly Hundred".

In February 2022, the Pastor Right Reverend Mitred Archpriest Philip Weiner, the leader of St. Josaphat's Ukrainian Catholic Church in Rochester, New York, said that there were more than 40,000 Ukrainians in the Rochester Metropolitan Area, which would make it one of the largest Ukrainian American communities in the country.

There are a large number of Ukrainian Protestants in the Sacramento metropolitan area who have organized support to those affected by the invasion of Ukraine through their local congregations.

Demographics

As of the 2000 U.S. Census, there were 892,922 Americans of full or partial Ukrainian descent. The New York City Metropolitan Area contains by far the largest Ukrainian community in the United States, due to historically receiving the highest number of Ukrainian immigrants.

The U.S. states with the largest Ukrainian populations are as follows:

The total number of people born in Ukraine is more than 275,155 residents.

Ukrainian-born population
Ukrainian-born population in the U.S. since 2010:

U.S. communities with high percentages of people of Ukrainian ancestry

The top 20 U.S. communities with the highest percentage of people claiming Ukrainian ancestry are:
 Cass Township, Pennsylvania (Schuylkill County, Pennsylvania) 14.30%
 Belfield, North Dakota 13.60%
 Gulich Township, Pennsylvania 12.70%
 Gilberton, Pennsylvania 12.40%
 Wilton, North Dakota 10.30%
 Lumberland, New York 9.90%
 Saint Clair, Pennsylvania 8.80%
 Soap Lake, Washington 8.10%
 Frackville, Pennsylvania 7.60%
 Olyphant, Pennsylvania and Norwegian Township, Pennsylvania 7.00%
 Houtzdale, Pennsylvania 6.90%
 Harmony Township, Pennsylvania (Beaver County, Pennsylvania) and Kerhonkson, New York 6.70%
 Baden, Pennsylvania and McAdoo, Pennsylvania 5.90%
 Branch Township, Pennsylvania and Postville, Iowa 5.70%
 Woodward Township, Pennsylvania (Clearfield County, Pennsylvania) and Northampton, Pennsylvania 5.60%
 Warren, New York and Independence, Ohio 5.50%
 West Leechburg, Pennsylvania 5.40%
 Ambridge, Pennsylvania, Mount Carmel Township, Pennsylvania, and Parma, Ohio 5.30%
 Ford City, Pennsylvania 5.20%
 Bigler Township, Pennsylvania and Kline Township, Pennsylvania 5.10%
 Mayfield Heights, Ohio 3.4%

U.S. communities with the highest percentage of residents born in Ukraine
Top 20 U.S. communities with the highest percentage of residents born in Ukraine are:
 Delta Junction, AK 16.4%
 Deltana, AK 8.4%
 Hamtramck, MI  8.0%
 West Hollywood, CA 7.8%
 Lumberland, NY 6.3%
 Moses Lake North, WA 6.0%
 Soap Lake, WA 6.0%
 Postville, IA 5.9%
 Warren, MI 4.0%
 Chicago, IL 4.0%
 Webster, NY 4.8%
 Peaceful Valley, WA 4.8%
 Pikesville, MD 4.5%
 Kerhonkson, NY 3.9%
 North Highlands, CA 3.6%
 Rancho Cordova, CA 3.3%
 Oak Park, MI 3.0%
 Flying Hills, PA 3.2%
 Waverly, NE 3.2%
 Fair Lawn, NJ 3.1%
 Buffalo Grove, IL 2.8%
 Feasterville-Trevose, PA 2.6%
 Smallwood, NY 2.5%
 Solvay, NY 2.5%
 North Port, FL 2.4%
 Detroit, MI  2.0%

Notable people

See also

 European Americans
 Hyphenated American
 The Ukrainian Museum (New York City)
 Ukrainian American Veterans
 Ukrainian Americans in New York City
 Ukrainian Americans in Los Angeles
 Ukrainian Australians
 Ukrainian Canadians
 Ukrainians in the United Kingdom
 Ukrainian Catholic Archeparchy of Philadelphia
 Ukrainian Congress Committee of America
 Ukrainian Orthodox Church of the USA
 Ukraine–United States relations

References

Sources

Further reading

 
 Fedunkiw, Marianne P. "Ukrainian Americans." in Gale Encyclopedia of Multicultural America, edited by Thomas Riggs, (3rd ed., vol. 4, Gale, 2014), pp. 459–474. online
 Lushnycky, Alex. Ukrainians of Greater Philadelphia (2007), 
 Kuropas,  Myron B.Ukrainians of Chicagoland (2006), 
 Wichar, Nancy Karen. Ukrainians of Metropolitan Detroit (2010),

External links
 Ukrainian Chicago
 Ukrainian American Archives & Museum of Detroit.
 Ukrainian American Heritage Days festival

 
European-American society
American